American Roland Food Corporation is a food product distributor in the New York metropolitan area. It is known for its food products and condiments. It is headquartered in Manhattan's Masonic Hall.

Roland's was purchased by Vestar Capital Partners in 2013.

References

External links
 

Food manufacturers of the United States